Zubaida Ahmed Tharwat (June 15, 1940 – December 13, 2016) was an Egyptian film, stage and television actress who was known for "the most beautiful eyes in classic Egyptian cinema". She was known for movies such as The Guilty (1975), The Other Man (1973), There is A Man in Our House (1961) and Part Virgin (1961).

Early life
Zubaida was born in Alexandria, Egypt on June 15, 1940, into an Egyptian family. Her father, Ahmed Tharwat, was an Egyptian Navy officer. As a teenager, she won a beauty contest in an Egyptian teen magazine which widely published her photograph and got her the attention of directors and producers. She studied at the Faculty of Law, Alexandria University.

Career
She made her first film appearance in the 1956 film Dalila, alongside stars of the day Shadia and Abdel Halim Hafez. She went on to work in many other films with other famous actors such as; Youssef Wahbi, Salah Zulfikar, Rushdy Abaza, Kamal el-Shennawi, Soad Hosny and Omar Sharif.
Tharwat appeared in the 1950s, 60's and 70's films, her notable roles include; Eni Atahem (1960), Fi Baytuna Ragol, El-Hob El-Daea''' (1970), Al-Rajul Al-Akhar (1973), and Al-Mothneboon (1975) among other works on stage such as;. Ana we Heya we mrati (1987). She retired from acting in the late 1980s. During her career, she was given many nicknames such as "The Pussycat of Arabic Cinema", "Magic Eyes" and "The Queen of Romance''".

Personal life
Tharwat had 3 siblings, Including her twin sister Hikmet. She married five times and had four daughters with her second husband, Egyptian producer Sobhy Farahat. Tharwat died at the age of 76 after a long battle with cancer and aging-associated diseases.

Filmography

Film

Stage

Television

References

External links

 
  Zubaida Tharwat at the Arab Cinema Database

1940 births
2016 deaths
People from Alexandria
Egyptian actresses
Egyptian stage actresses
Egyptian film actresses
Egyptian voice actresses
Egyptian television actresses
Deaths from cancer in Egypt
Faculty of Law
Egyptian twins